Isabelle Wallace (born 7 September 1996) is a Scottish-Australian former tennis player.

She made her WTA Tour main-draw debut at the 2018 Australian Open, after being awarded a wildcard into the women's doubles with Naiktha Bains.

Wallace has career-high WTA rankings of No. 243 in singles, achieved on 15 January 2018, and 326 in doubles, set in November 2017. She won six singles and two doubles titles on the ITF Circuit.

Early life
She was born and raised in Inverness, Scotland before moving to Melbourne, Australia when she was ten and representing Australia at international tournaments. After six years, Wallace and her family moved back to Scotland where she then chose to represent Great Britain. In 2015, Wallace made the decision to represent Australia again in international sporting competitions due to lack of support from the Lawn Tennis Association.

Junior career
As a junior, Wallace had a career-high ranking of No. 37, achieved in January 2014. Her junior highlights include reaching the third round of the girls' singles at the Australian Open and the French Open in 2014.

ITF Circuit finals

Singles: 8 (6 titles, 2 runner–ups)

Doubles: 10 (2 titles, 8 runner–ups)

External links
 
 
 

Living people
1996 births
Australian female tennis players
Sportswomen from Victoria (Australia)
Scottish female tennis players
Sportspeople from Inverness
Sportspeople from Valencia
Tennis players from Melbourne
Australian expatriate sportspeople in Spain
Scottish emigrants to Australia
Naturalised citizens of Australia
Naturalised tennis players